Robert Burge (born 20 September 1905) was a rugby union player who represented Australia.

Burge, a centre, was born in Inverell, New South Wales and claimed a total of 4 international rugby caps for Australia.

References

Australian rugby union players
Australia international rugby union players
1905 births
Year of death missing
Rugby union players from New South Wales
Rugby union centres